Nick Johne is a Canadian actor who is best known for playing Murray Woolworth's dimwitted assistant Dwayne Dortmund on the second season of The Red Green Show.

Career
Nick majored in microbiology at the Ontario Agricultural College and began his improvisational career in Toronto, where free improv classes were being taught at the Harbourfront Centre. After failing out of microbiology and various forays in the theatrical world, Johne joined the Second City troupe in Toronto in 1991, where he performed in several award winning shows.

Personal life
Johne currently resides in Chicago, Illinois, where he teaches at the Chicago Second City training center and is a part time faculty member in the theatre department at DePaul University.

Filmography
The Republic of Love (2003)
The Visual Bible: The Gospel of John (2003)
The Pooch and the Pauper (2000) 
The Lady in Question (1999) 
Dog Park (1998) 
Hidden in America (1996) 
Ghost Mom (1993)

References

External links

1955 births
Living people
Canadian male film actors
Canadian male television actors
Male actors from Toronto